Karadoc Solar Farm is a photovoltaic power station  south of Mildura near the town of Iraak in the Australian state of Victoria. It can generate up to 112MW of electricity, and was designed by  BayWa r.e. Solar. It was officially opened in March 2019.

It has an offtake agreement to provide 74,000 MWh per year of electricity to Carlton & United Breweries for 12 years. At the time of its construction, it was the largest in Victoria at 90 MW, 120 MW.

References

Solar power stations in Victoria (Australia)